Carole M. Cusack is an Australian historian of religion, specialising in Early Medieval Northwestern Europe, western esotericism, and trends in contemporary religion. Currently employed at the University of Sydney, she has published a number of books during her career.

Bibliography

Books

References

External links
University of Sydney staff page

Living people
Year of birth missing (living people)
Academic staff of the University of Sydney
Pagan studies scholars
Western esotericism scholars